St. Josaphat ( and in Kashubian as Kòscół Swiãtégò Jozafata) is a historic church of the Roman Catholic Archdiocese of Chicago located at 2311 North Southport Avenue in Chicago, Illinois.

It is a prime example of the so-called 'Polish Cathedral style' of church in both its opulence and grand scale. St. Josaphat's two massive Romanesque belltowers are a hallmark view of the Lincoln Park skyline.

History of Saint Josaphat's Parish
The congregation dates back to 1882, when a 13-member committee of Chicago's Kashubian Polish community formally approached the Resurrectionist Father Vincent Barzynski, then Chicago's preeminent Polish priest, for his assistance in establishing a Kashubian parish. Prior to this most of the Kashubian families had been attending Mass at Saint Michael's Parish, a "German" parish which they preferred to Father Barzynski's own "Polish" parish of Saint Stanislaus Kostka. The current combination church-school building, an imposing brick edifice, was dedicated on May 22, 1884.

The parish attracted Polish settlement in this area of the Lincoln Park neighborhood of Chicago, many of them also of Kashubian descent, as part of what is called the Kashubian diaspora. In 1902, Saint Josaphat claimed about 5,000 parishioners. This concentration led to the neighborhood being referred to as Kaszubowo by local Poles.

By 1980, roughly half of Saint Josaphat's 450 families self-identified as Polish American, with 30% self-identifying as Mexican American.  In the twenty-first century, Saint Josaphat's now serves an overwhelmingly young, white, urban professional congregation in a newly prosperous, gentrified neighborhood.  The renovated church, with its traditional Catholic architecture, is popular for weddings, with over 65 a year.

Architecture
The Romanesque church, built at a cost of $125,000 in 1902, was designed by William J. Brinkmann, who also drew plans for the Neogothic masterpiece of St. Michael the Archangel in South Chicago.

See also
Kashubians
Polish Cathedral style churches of Chicago
Polish Americans
Poles in Chicago
Roman Catholicism in Poland

Church in architecture books

External links
 Archdiocese of Chicago
 PGSA - St. Josaphat Church History

References

Josaphats
Religious organizations established in 1884
Roman Catholic churches completed in 1902
Kashubian-American history
Josaphats
Polish Cathedral style architecture
National parishes
Polish-American Roman Catholic parishes in the United States
20th-century Roman Catholic church buildings in the United States
1884 establishments in Illinois